Uday Singh Commissioner of Oaths, OBE, JP (14 September 1938 – 7 June 2014) was an Indo-Fijian landowner, social worker and politician. Hon. Mr Singh was a staunch supporter of former Prime Minister Ratu Mara and the former Alliance Party. The Singh family is the single largest private landowner in Fiji.

Family

Born to Jang Bhadur Singh and Manorama Singh on 14 September 1938. Uday Singh grew up with his parents, brothers and sisters on the Singh Family Estate at KumKum, Ba. His brothers were: James Shankar Singh, Sital Singh, Bir Singh, Robert Singh (Soki) and Kuar Singh.

Uday Singh was married to Vidya Singh, whom he had known since childhood. They have 4 children Alindra Singh, Shalendra Singh, Sharmila Singh and Sameer Singh and nine grandchildren; the oldest being Ashneet Singh and Rupashna Singh.

Background
After leaving school Singh worked with his father on their grand estate. He developed an appreciation of the business of farming and on acquired three hundred and fifty acres of farm land. Such interest and dedication made him very attached to this vocation and that is the major reason for him being the gang president of KumKum P/L gang in the Moto Sector for such a long time. Singh did a substantial amount of cane farming which was substantial contribution to the Fiji Islands commerce of sugar production and provided support for numerous families living on his farm land in Ba. Singh’s family business is the largest contributors to the nations import and export business.

The nature of farming community did not isolate him from the many intricacies of the total society ranging from children's education to the national politics and he had no qualms to be actively involved in all the major areas of the total existence and the sound maintenance of the society and the nation of as a whole.

This vigor led him to serve in the various educational, religious boards and to take active participation in politics and in various areas of national development.

The Singh family are the largest private land owners of the Fiji Islands.

Professional life
Uday Singh was a cane farmer and Gang president of KumKum in Moto Sector, Ba, since 1960. In 1970-1995 he was the chairman of Ba Health Center. Between 1985-1987 Singh was the director of the Sugar Fund Authority, between this period he was also a Member of Parliament. He was a commissioner in the Fiji Public Service Commission between 1987-2001. In 1992 he became a member of the delegation to the United Nation. From 1994-1999 he was a Senator in the House of Senate Fiji. Between 1992-1997 he was the director of Yaqara Pastrol Farm Limited.

Political career 
After several unsuccessful attempts in earlier elections, he won the Indian National seat based in Ba in a by-election in 1985 in which he defeated his brother, James Shankar Singh of the National Federation Party and Mahendra Chaudhry of the Fiji Labour Party. This was the first election contested by the Labour Party and its candidate was the future Prime Minister of Fiji, Mahendra Chaudhry. The election was won by Uday Singh with 7848 votes defeating Mahendra Chaudhry who got 7644 votes and James Shankar Singh a distant third with 5003 votes. In the 1987 elections he stood as a NFP-Labour coalition candidate for the Nasinu/Vunidawa Indian Communal Constituency and won his seat easily[1] but the coup of 1987 ended his political career. He was later appointed to the Senate by President Ratu Sir Kamisese Mara, effective from 30 May 1994. Uday Singh was one of the most successful and powerful political figures in the country. The Singh family are til this day known for their unprecedented impact and popularity in the nation. They are one of the most impactful and powerful family’s.

Supporter of Arya Samaj 
Singh was a supporter of Arya Samaj in Fiji and played a leading role in the Ba branch of the Arya Pratinidhi Sabha of Fiji. He was the chairman of the Board of Governors of the two schools run by the Arya Samaj in Ba. He was national president of Arya Pratinidhi Sabha of Fiji from 1984-1987. Singh was awarded the highest honor of the Arya Samaj, the title Arya Ratna, in 2002. The Title of Arya Ratna was conferred for exceptionally valuable contribution to Arya Samaj.

Awards and Merits
1970 - Independence Medal
1974- Justice of Peace
1985- Order of British Empire (OBE)
1994- Commissioner of Oaths 
1995- Fiji 25th Anniversary Independence Award 
2002- Arya Ratna

Death 
He died in Ba Mission hospital in the early hours of 7 June 2014, after being admitted the night before.

References 

Arya Samajis in Fiji
Alliance Party (Fiji) politicians
Indian members of the House of Representatives (Fiji)
Indian members of the Senate (Fiji)
2014 deaths
1938 births
Fiji Labour Party politicians
Politicians from Ba Province